With the Aid of Phrenology is a lost 1913  short silent film comedy directed by Edward Dillon and starring Charles Murray. It was produced by the Biograph Company and released as a split-reel with Dyed But Not Dead.

Cast
Charles Murray - The Husband
Louise Orth - The Wife
Dave Morris - The Strong Man
Kathleen Butler - Suffragette

References

External links
 With the Aid of Phrenology at IMDb.com
 lobby poster

1913 short films
American black-and-white films
Lost American films
Biograph Company films
Films directed by Edward Dillon
Silent American comedy films
1913 comedy films
1913 films
1913 lost films
1910s American films